Assunta Galeone (born 24 February 1998) is an Italian judoka.

She is the bronze medallist of the 2017 Judo Grand Prix Tbilisi in the -78 kg category.

References

External links
 

1986 births
Living people
Italian female judoka
Mediterranean Games silver medalists for Italy
Mediterranean Games medalists in judo
Competitors at the 2013 Mediterranean Games
Judoka at the 2015 European Games
European Games medalists in judo
European Games bronze medalists for Italy
21st-century Italian women